"Endorphins" is the fourth single by British DJ and record producer Sub Focus, released from his second studio album Torus. The song features vocals from British singer Alex Clare. The song has reached number 10 on the UK Singles Chart and number seven on the UK Dance Chart.

Background and release
"Endorphins" originally featured female vocalist Amanda Ghost, and was given to several artists including Ian Dench and Takura who wrote parts of the song. However, in the end Alex Clare visited Douwma's studio to record what would be the final version of the track. The song entered the UK Singles Chart at number 10, making it his highest-charting single to date.

Music video
A music video to accompany the release of "Endorphins" was first released onto YouTube on 1 May 2013 at a total length of four minutes and 11 seconds. In the video, due to an enforced belief of "Unity Through Compliance", soldiers must keep order by preventing people from listening to music. They exercise this by finding people doing such in hideouts and capturing them. They also destroy and burn their speakers, stereos and records. At the end of the video, the soldiers are ironically seen playing a stereo.

Track listing

Charts

Certifications

Release history

References

2013 songs
2013 singles
Sub Focus songs
Mercury Records singles
RAM Records singles
Songs written by Ian Dench
Songs written by Amanda Ghost
Songs written by Takura
Songs written by Sub Focus